Justine Rodrigues (born 17 March 1993) is a footballer who plays as a midfielder for Guelph Union in League1 Ontario. Born in Canada, she represents the Guyana women's national team.

Early life
Rodrigues played youth soccer with Brampton Brams United.

College career
Rodrigues attended Gannon University, playing for the women's soccer team from 2011 to 2014. In 2011, as a freshman, she earned Daktronics All-Atlantic Region second team and National Soccer Coaches Association of America (NSCAA) All-Atlantic Region third-team honours. In 2013, she earned All-PSAC Third Team honours. In 2014, she earned All-PSAC Second Team, NSCAA Third Team, and First Team All-ECAC honours. Over her time at Gannon, she scored 20 goals and recorded nine assists, with eight game-winning goals over 74 appearances.

Playing career
In 2018 and 2019, she played for the Oakville Blue Devils in League1 Ontario. 

In 2021, she played for Vaughan Azzurri.

In 2022, she played for Guelph Union.

International career
She made her debut for the  Guyana national team at age 16. She has also represented the Guyana U20 team.

In 2020,she served as the athletic trainer for Guyana at the U20 Olympic soccer qualifiers held in the Dominican Republic.

International goals
Scores and results list Guyana's goal tally first

Personal life 
She is the cousin of fellow Guyana national team player Ashley Rodrigues.

See also
List of Guyana women's international footballers

References

External links 
 

1993 births
Living people
Citizens of Guyana through descent
Guyanese women's footballers
Women's association football defenders
Gannon Golden Knights women's soccer players
Guyana women's international footballers
Guyanese expatriate footballers
Guyanese expatriate sportspeople in the United States
Expatriate women's soccer players in the United States
People from the Regional Municipality of Halton
Soccer people from Ontario
Canadian expatriate women's soccer players
Canadian expatriate sportspeople in the United States
Canadian sportspeople of Guyanese descent
Vaughan Azzurri (women) players
Blue Devils FC (women) players
League1 Ontario (women) players
Guelph Union players